Mahadev "Satya" Satyanarayanan is an Indian experimental computer scientist, an ACM and IEEE fellow, and the Carnegie Group Professor of Computer Science at Carnegie Mellon University (CMU). 

He is credited with many advances in edge computing, distributed systems, mobile computing, pervasive computing, and Internet of Things. His research focus is around performance, scalability, availability, and trust challenges in computing systems from the cloud to the mobile edge.

His work on the Andrew File System (AFS) was recognized with the ACM Software System Award in 2016 and the ACM SIGOPS Hall of Fame Award in 2008 for its influence and impact. His work on disconnected operation in Coda File System received the ACM SIGOPS Hall of Fame Award in 2015 and the inaugural ACM SIGMOBILE Test-of-Time Award in 2016.

He served as the founding Program Chairman of the IEEE/ACM Symposium on Edge Computing and the HotMobile workshops, the founding Editor-in-Chief of IEEE Pervasive Computing, and the founding Area Editor for the Synthesis Series on Mobile and Pervasive Computing. In addition, he was the founding director of Intel Research Pittsburgh and an advisor to the company Maginatics, which was acquired by EMC in 2014.

Education 
He has a bachelor's and master's degree from Indian Institute of Technology, Madras in 1975 and 1977, and his Ph.D. in computer science from CMU in 1983.

Andrew File System 

Satya was a principal architect and implementer of the Andrew File System (AFS), the technical forerunner of modern cloud-based storage systems.  AFS has been continuously deployed at CMU since 1986, at a scale of many thousands of users. From its conception in 1983 as the unifying campus-wide IT infrastructure for CMU, AFS evolved through versions AFS-1, AFS-2 and AFS-3. In mid-1989, AFS-3 was commercialized by Transarc Corporation and its evolution continued outside CMU. Transarc was acquired by IBM, and AFS became an IBM product for a number of years.  In 2000, IBM released the code to the open source community as OpenAFS.  Since its release as OpenAFS, the system has continued to be used in many enterprises all over the world.  In the academic and research lab community, OpenAFS is in use at more than 30 sites in the United States (including CMU, MIT, and Stanford) and dozens of sites in Europe, New Zealand, and South Korea. Many global companies have used OpenAFS including Morgan Stanley, Goldman Sachs, Qualcomm, IBM, United Airlines, Pfizer, Hitachi, InfoPrint, and Pictage.

Over a 30-year period, AFS has been a seminal influence on academic research and commercial practice in distributed data storage systems for unstructured data. The design principles that were initially discovered and validated in the creation and evolution of AFS have influenced virtually all modern commercial distributed file systems, including Microsoft DFS, Google File System, Lustre File System, Ceph, and NetApp ONTAP. In addition, AFS inspired the creation of DropBox whose founders used AFS as part of Project Athena at MIT. It also inspired the creation of Maginatics, a startup company advised by Satya that provides cloud-sourced network-attached storage for distributed environments. The NFS v4 network file system protocol standard has been extensively informed by the lessons of AFS.  In 2016, AFS was honored with the prestigious ACM Software System Award. Earlier, ACM recognized the significance of AFS by inducting a key paper on it to the ACM SIGOPS Hall of Fame. The AFS papers in 1985 and 1987 also received Outstanding Paper awards at the ACM Symposium on Operating System Principles.

Coda File System 

In 1987, Satya began work on the Coda File System to address a fundamental shortcoming of AFS-like systems. Extensive first-hand experience with the AFS deployment at CMU showed that users are severely impacted by server and network failures. This vulnerability is not just hypothetical, but indeed a fact of life in real-world deployments. Once users become critically dependent on files cached from servers, a server or network failure renders these files inaccessible and leaves clients crippled for the duration of the failure. In a large enough system, unplanned outages of servers and network segments are practically impossible to avoid. Today's enthusiastic embrace of cloud computing rekindles many of these concerns because of increased dependence on centralized resources, The goal of the Coda project was to preserve the many strengths of AFS, while reducing its vulnerability to failures. Coda was the first system to show how server replication could be combined with client caching to achieve good performance and high availability. Coda invented the concept of "disconnected operation", in which cached state on clients is used to mask network and server failures. Coda also demonstrated bandwidth-adaptive weakly-connected operation over networks with low bandwidth, high latency or frequent failures. Coda's use of optimistic replication, trading consistency for availability, was controversial when introduced. Today, it is a standard practice in all data storage systems for mobile environments. Coda also pioneered the concept of translucent caching, which balances the full transparency of classic caching with the user visibility needed to achieve a good user experience on bandwidth-challenged networks. The Coda concepts of hoarding, reintegration and application-specific conflict resolution are found in the cloud sync capabilities of virtually all mobile devices today. Key ideas from Coda were incorporated by Microsoft into the IntelliMirror component of Windows 2000 and the Cached Exchange Mode of Outlook 2003. Papers relating to Coda received Outstanding Paper awards at the 1991 and 1993 ACM Symposium on Operating System Principles. In 1999, Coda received the LinuxWorld Editor's Choice Award. A 2002 narrative retrospective, "The Evolution of Coda" traces its evolution and the lessons learned from it. Later, Coda's long-lasting impact was recognized with the ACM SIGOPS Hall of Fame Award in 2015 and the inaugural ACM SIGMOBILE Test-of-Time Award in 2016.

Odyssey: Application-aware Adaptation for Mobile Applications 

In the mid-1990s, Satya initiated the Odyssey project to explore how operating systems should be extended to support future mobile applications. While Coda supported mobility in an application-transparent manner, Odyssey explored the space of application-aware approaches to mobility. Wireless network bandwidth and energy (i.e., battery life) were two of the key resource challenges faced by mobile applications. Odyssey invented the concept of application-aware adaptation and showed how the system call interface to the Unix operating system could be extended to support this new class of mobile applications such as video delivery and speech recognition. Odyssey envisioned a collaborative partnership between the operating system and individual applications. In this partnership, the operating system monitors, controls and allocates scarce resources such as wireless network bandwidth and energy, while the individual applications negotiate with the operating system on their resource requirements and modify application behavior to offer the best user experience achievable under current resource conditions. The 1997 and 1999 Odyssey papers on application-aware adaptation and energy-aware adaptation in the ACM Symposium on Operating System Principles have proved to be highly influential. The concepts of multi-fidelity algorithms and predictive resource management that emerged from this work have also proved to be influential.

Aura: Cloud Offload for IoT 

In the late 1990s, Satya initiated the Aura Project in collaboration with CMU faculty colleagues David Garlan, Raj Reddy, Peter Steenkiste, Dan Siewiorek and Asim Smailagic. The challenge addressed by this effort was to reduce human distraction in mobile and pervasive computing environments, recognizing that human attention does not benefit from Moore's Law, while computing resources do. This leads directly to the notion of invisible computing, which parallels Mark Weiser's characterization of an ideal technology as one that disappears. The Aura vision proved to be an excellent driver of research in mobile and pervasive computing in areas such as cyber foraging, location-aware computing, energy-awareness, and task-level adaptation. In particular, the 1997 paper "Agile Application-Aware Adaptation for Mobile Computing" pioneered "cloud offload," in which mobile devices transmit processed sensor data to a cloud service for further analysis over a wireless network. A modern incarnation of this idea is speech recognition using Siri. Specifically, a user's speech is captured by a microphone, pre-processed, and then sent to a cloud service that converts speech to text. Satya continues to do IoT-related research. He retrospectively described the evolutionary path from his early work to today's cloud-based mobile and IoT systems in "A Brief History of Cloud Offload: A Personal Journey from Odyssey Through Cyber Foraging to Cloudlets.".

Reflecting on the Aura vision and IoT implementation experience to date, Satya wrote an invited paper in 2001 entitled "Pervasive Computing: Vision and Challenges." This has proved to be his most widely cited work according to Google Scholar, and continues to receive well over 100 citations each year. The concepts discussed in this paper have directly inspired today's popular vision of an "Internet of Things (IoT)." In 2018, this visionary paper was recognized by the ACM SIGMOBILE Test-of-Time Award.

Internet Suspend/Resume (ISR): Virtual Desktop 

Building on Intel's newly available VT virtual machine (VM) technology in 2001, ISR represents an AFS-like capability for cloud-sourced VMs. Instead of just delivering files, ISR enables entire computing environments (including the operating system and all applications) to be delivered from the cloud with perfect fidelity through on-demand caching to the edges of the Internet. The June 2002 paper introducing the ISR concept was the first to articulate the concept of wide-area hands-free mobile computing with a "zero-pound laptop." The ISR concept has proved to be highly influential in the mobile computing research community, spawning related research efforts in industry and academia. A series of implementations (ISR-1, ISR-2, ISR-3, and OpenISR) and associated deployments of ISR at CMU have investigated the implementation trade-offs in this space and demonstrated the real-world viability of this technology. The ISR project inspired commercial software such as Citrix XenDesktop and Microsoft Remote Desktop Services, commonly known as Virtual Desktop Infrastructure (VDI). The VDI industry has since become a billion-dollar industry.

Olive: Execution Fidelity for Software Archiving 

The work on ISR inspired the Olive project, a collaboration between the computer science and digital library communities. One of the major challenges of digital archiving is the ability to preserve and accurately reproduce executable content across time periods of many decades (and eventually centuries). This problem also has analogs in industry. For example, a NASA space probe to the edge of the solar system may take 30 years to reach its destination; software maintenance over such an extended period requires precise re-creation of the probe's onboard software environment. By encapsulating the entire software environment in a VM (including, optionally, a software emulator for now-obsolete hardware), Olive preserves and dynamically reproduces the precise execution behavior of software. The Olive prototype demonstrated reliable archiving of software dating back to the early 1980s. The concept of execution fidelity, introduced by Olive, has proved to be highly influential in digital archiving.

Diamond: Unindexed Search for High-dimensional Data 

The Diamond project explored interactive search of complex data such as photographs, video, and medical images that have not been tagged or indexed a priori. For such unstructured and high-dimensional data, the classical approach of full-text indexing is not viable: in contrast to text, which is human-authored and one-dimensional, raw image data requires a feature extraction step prior to indexing. Unfortunately, the features to extract for a given search are not known a priori. Only through interactive trial and error, with partial results to guide his progress, can a user converge on the best choice of features for a specific search. To support this search workflow, the OpenDiamond platform provided a storage architecture for discard-based search that pipelines user control, feature extraction, and per-object indexing computation and result caching. As documented in a 2010 paper, the I/O workloads generated by Diamond searches differ significantly from well-understood indexing workloads such as Hadoop, with important implications for storage subsystems. The unique search capabilities of Diamond attracted significant interest in the medical and pharmaceutical research communities. Researchers in these communities collaborated in creating Diamond-based applications for domains such as radiology (breast cancer screening), pathology and dermatology (melanoma diagnosis), drug discovery (anomaly detection), and craniofacial genetics (cleft lip syndrome genetic screening). The work on Diamond and associated software spurred extensive collaboration between Satya's research group at CMU and Health Sciences at the University of Pittsburgh. The collaboration with pathologists led to the design and implementation of OpenSlide a vendor‐neutral open source library for digital pathology. OpenSlide is in use today by many academic and industrial organizations worldwide, including many research sites in the United States that are funded by the National Institutes of Health and companies such as HistoWiz.

Elijah: Edge Computing 
Satya pioneered edge computing with the 2009 publication of the paper "The Case for VM-based Cloudlets in Mobile Computing," and his ensuing research efforts in Project Elijah. This paper is now widely recognized as the founding manifesto of edge computing, and has proved to be highly influential in shaping thoughts and actions. It was written in close collaboration with Victor Bahl from Microsoft, Roy Want from Intel (now at Google), Ramon Caceres from AT&T (also at Google now), and Nigel Davies from Lancaster University. This paper introduced the concept of cloudlets, which are small data-centers located at the network edge. As a new computing tier between mobile devices and the cloud, they have powerful computational resources and excellent connectivity to mobile devices, typically just one wireless hop away. Their low latency and high bandwidth to mobile users and sensors make them ideal locations for offloading computation. A detailed account of the origin of the paper and the cloudlet concept is described in the 2014 retrospective, "A Brief History of Cloud Offload: A Personal Journey from Odyssey Through Cyber Foraging to Cloudlets."

Edge computing has now become one of the hottest topics in industry and academia. It is particularly relevant to mobile and IoT use cases in which a significant amount of live sensor data needs to be intensively processed in real-time. Many applications in domains such as VR/AR, factory automation, and autonomous vehicles exhibit such workflow. For example, high-quality commercial VR headsets, such as Oculus Rift and HTC Vive, require tethering to a GPU-equipped desktop. Such tethering negatively impacts user experience. On the other hand, untethered devices sacrifice the quality of the virtual environment. Fundamentally, these latency-sensitive, resource-hungry, and bandwidth-intensive applications cannot run on mobile devices alone due to insufficient compute power, nor can they run in the cloud due to long network latency. Only edge computing can break this deadlock.

The concepts of VM synthesis and VM handoff were conceived and demonstrated in Elijah, leading to the OpenStack++ reference implementation of cloudlet software infrastructure. The Open Edge Computing Initiative is a collection of companies working closely with CMU to build an open ecosystem for edge computing.

Gabriel: Wearable Cognitive Assistance 
In 2004, Satya wrote the thought piece "Augmenting Cognition" that imagined a world in which human receive useful real-time guidance on everyday tasks from wearable devices whose capabilities are amplified by nearby compute servers. A decade later, with the emergence of edge computing and the commercial availability of wearable devices such as Google Glass and Microsoft Hololens, the prerequisites to realize this vision were at hand. Satya initiated Project Gabriel to explore this new genre of applications, which combine the look and feel of augmented reality (AR) with algorithms associated with artificial intelligence (AI). The 2014 paper "Towards Wearable Cognitive Assistance" describes the Gabriel platform for such application. Many applications (such as one to assemble an IKEA Table Lamp) have been built on the Gabriel platform, and videos of them are available here. In these applications, a user wears a head-mounted smart glasses that continuously captures actions and surroundings from a first-person viewpoint. In real-time, the video stream is transmitted to a cloudlet and analyzed to identify the state of the assembly. Audiovisual instructions are then generated to demonstrate a subsequent procedure or to alert and correct a mistake. In 2016, CBS 60 minutes covered the Gabriel project in a special edition on Artificial Intelligence.

References

External links
Mahadev Satyanarayanan's Home Page
Coda/Odyssey
Aura
Internet Suspend/Resume
Elijah and Gabriel projects

Carnegie Mellon University alumni
Carnegie Mellon University faculty
Fellows of the Association for Computing Machinery
Fellow Members of the IEEE
Living people
1953 births